Kim Alcheon (aka, So Alcheon, 577-654). He was a well-known general during Queen Seondeok's era and served as a Sangdaedeung during Queen Jindeok's reign.

Biography
He was the son of Hyeongong - a man of Seonggol rank, who deliberately married a woman of a lower rank (Jingol), in order to keep his children away from the bloody fight over the throne, which eventually made Alcheon a Jingol.

According to Samguk Yusa, Alcheon was a member of the Hwarang, during King Jipyeong's reign.

Year 636, Queen Seondeok, ordered him to drive off the Baekje forces in Yeoguen-gok. He helped Kim Yushin to suppress Bidam's rebellion, against Queen Seondeok, on February of year 637. After Queen Seondeok died, he was appointed as the next Sangdaedeung for Queen Jindeok. He led his soldiers to victory over the Goguryeo forces, when the Goguryeo army invaded Chiljung castle, on year 638.

Year 654, Queen Jindeok died without a successor. Being a Sangdaedeung, Alcheon, had the strongest chance for the throne. However, he refused, saying, "He is already too old for the position and doesn't even have the desire to do so." He then gave his support to Kim Chunchu, who became King Taejong Muyeol.

After that, Kim Alcheon changed his last name from Kim to So.
He was the founder of the So clan in Silla.  The So clan from Jinju had a prestigious lineage, as they held the office of Sangdaedeung - the highest and most prestigious office that one could attain next to the throne itself.

A famous legend about Alcheon's bravery relates that once, Alcheon was out in the forest together with the other . Suddenly, a tiger appeared and was about to attack them. The  were terrified and started to panic, but Alcheon just smiled and attacked the tiger alone and killed it with his bare hands.

Popular culture
 Portrayed by Lee Seung-hyo in the 2009 MBC TV series Queen Seondeok.
 Portrayed by Im Hyuk in the 2012-2013 KBS1 TV series The King's Dream.
 Portrayed in the 2021 WEBNOVEL titled QUEEN JINDEOK by author GLORIAN.C.REGNARE.

References
^ Il-yeon: Samguk Yusa: Legends and History of the Three Kingdoms of Ancient Korea, translated by Tae-Hung Ha and Grafton K. Mintz. Book One, page 64. Silk Pagoda (2006). 

Silla people
Silla Buddhists
Korean generals
Korean warriors
577 births
654 deaths
7th-century Korean people
7th-century deaths
Jinju So clan
6th-century Korean people